Sira` Fi al-Mina  (but also titled Obscure Waters in later releases) is a 1956 Egyptian romance/crime/drama film directed by the acclaimed Egyptian film director Youssef Chahine. It starred Omar Sharif, Ahmed Ramzy, and Faten Hamama.

Plot 
The film takes place in a port in Alexandria and focuses on the lives of some sailors. Hamidah (Faten Hamama) works in a ship and plans to marry her cousin, Ragab (Omar Sharif), but Ragab is forced to leave for a long period. While he was away, Hamidah falls in love with Mamdouh, a wealthy man. Ragab returns three years later to find her in a relationship with someone else. He fights for her and wins her back again and marries her.

Main cast 
Faten Hamama as Hamidah
Omar Sharif as Ragab
Ferdoos Mohammed as Ragab's mother
Ahmed Ramzy as Mamdouh
Hussein Riad as Mamdouh's father
Tawfik Aldikn as GM

References

External links

1956 films
1950s Arabic-language films
1956 crime drama films
Egyptian black-and-white films
Egyptian crime drama films
Films set in Alexandria
Films directed by Youssef Chahine